Bruno Gerber (born August 23, 1964 in Rothenfluh) is a Swiss bobsledder who competed in the late 1980s and the early 1990s. He won four medals at the FIBT World Championships with three golds (Two-man: 1990, Four-man: 1989, 1990) and two silvers (Two-man: 1991, Four-man: 1991).

Gerber also finished fifth in the four-man event at the 1992 Winter Olympics in Albertville.

References
Bobsleigh two-man world championship medalists since 1931
Bobsleigh four-man world championship medalists since 1930
1992 bobsleigh four-man results

1964 births
Bobsledders at the 1992 Winter Olympics
Living people
Olympic bobsledders of Switzerland
Swiss male bobsledders
Sportspeople from Basel-Landschaft
20th-century Swiss people